Wilhelm Ferdinand Arndt (27 September 1838, Lobsens, Posen, Prussia – 10 January 1895) was a German historian.

Biography
He graduated from the University of Göttingen (PhD 1861) and became connected with the University of Leipzig (privatdozent, 1875/76; associate professor of auxiliary sciences of history, 1876–94).

Works
For many years he was a collaborator on the Monumenta Germaniæ Historica (1862–75).

His chief works are:
 Kleine Denkmäler aus der Merowingerzeit (“Small monuments from Merovingian times,” 1874)
 Schrifttafeln zur Erlernung der lateinischen Paläographie (“Tables of characters for the study of Latin paleography,” 1874, 3d ed., 1898)

References

1838 births
1895 deaths
People from Piła County
People from the Grand Duchy of Posen
University of Göttingen alumni
Academic staff of Leipzig University
19th-century German historians
19th-century German writers
19th-century German male writers
German male non-fiction writers
German medievalists
German palaeographers